Les Îles-de-la-Madeleine (Magdalen Islands) is one of two municipalities forming the urban agglomeration of Magdalen Islands in Quebec, Canada. It is part of the Gaspésie–Îles-de-la-Madeleine region and its population was 12,010 as of the 2016 Census.

As part of a municipal reorganization across Quebec, the seven communities of the Magdalen Islands amalgamated to form the municipality of Magdalen Islands on January 1, 2002. However, after a referendum in 2004 the community of Grosse-Île decided to split from the municipality, effective January 1, 2006. Although Grindstone likewise voted to split in the same referendum, it did not actually do so.

Communities
The following are the six formerly independent communities that constitute Magdalen Islands:

Grindstone (Cap-aux-Meules)
Located on Grindstone Island (Île du Cap aux Meules in French), Grindstone was settled as early as the 19th century. Before the 2002 amalgamation, it was the Magdalen Islands' smallest community in land area, but because of its location at the centre of the archipelago, it has become the most important business centre of the islands and, as such, was named "Capital of the Islands". The ferry servicing Cap-aux-Meules to Souris, Prince Edward Island constitutes the archipelago's only port of entry by sea.

The name of the community is associated to the grindstone quarry located on the island. Its population was as of, 2006, 1,685.

Fatima
Also located on Grindstone Island, Fatima was settled between 1820 and 1845. It is named after Fátima in Portugal, a pilgrimage site highly visited after three young shepherds claimed the Holy Virgin appeared to them. Its population, as of 2006, was 2,809.

Grande-Entrée
Separated from the rest of Magdalen Islands by the municipality of Grosse-Île, Grande-Entrée is located on Grand Entry Island, named after the two headlands facing each other and creating a bay safe for boats and ships to harbour. Scots settled on the island at the end of the 18th century, but Basque fishermen had been to the area during the 16th century.  Its population as of 2006, was 624.

House Harbour

The first settlers came to Havre-aux-Maisons, located on House Harbour Island (Île du Havre aux Maisons in French), in 1765 from Acadia. The island was first known as Allright Island, then Alwright, and then Saunders, after sir Charles Saunders, a British admiral who accompanied General James Wolfe to Quebec City in 1759. The harbour between Grindstone and House Harbour islands was already known in 1756 as Harbour Maison. Since nobody lived on the island before 1765, the singular form for Maison could be attributed to the ruins of a habitation built by early Basque visitors and found by French explorers in 1663. Its population, as of 2006, was 2,078.

Îles-de-la-Madeleine Airport, Magdalen Islands' only port of entry by air, is located at Havre-aux-Maisons.

The hamlet of Dune-du-Sud, northeast of Havre-aux-Maisons, is a Hydro-Québec experimentation site to assess power lines' resistance to high winds. In 1993, it built a vertical-axis windmill, but the project did not go further past the experimental level. The windmill is now purely decorative.

L'Étang-du-Nord

L'Étang-du-Nord is composed of several hamlets running along the eastern coast of Grindstone Island, a few kilometres (miles) away from Cap-aux-Meules. Main fishing centre of the archipelago, the coast was settled around 1830. The community hosts a campus of Cégep de la Gaspésie et des Îles, the Magdalen Islands' only post-secondary institution. Population as of 2006, 3,126.

Amherst

Amherst is composed of three distinct hamlets, Havre-Aubert and Bassin (both on Amherst Island, Île du Havre Aubert in French) and L'Île-d'Entrée, on Entry Island (Île d'Entrée in French). Population as of 2006, 2,238.

Amherst Island's first settlers arrived in 1762 from Acadia, Prince Edward Island and the Chaleur Bay. A municipality, Havre-Aubert, was constituted in 1875 and changed its name to Bassin in 1959. Another municipality, Havre-Aubert-Est, was constituted in 1951 and changed its name to Havre-Aubert in 1964. Both amalgamated in 1971 and took the name of L'Île-du-Havre-Aubert. The island is a member of the Most Beautiful Villages of Quebec.

Historians do not agree on the origin of the name "Havre-Aubert." Some suggested the name of an obscure friend of Jacques Cartier, while others brought up Thomas Aubert, a sailor from Dieppe and one of the Americas' first explorers, or François Aubert de La Chesnaye, who would have supported the colonization efforts of New France, as likely explanations. Some have mentioned a family of sailors named "Auber" and other hypotheses include that of French explorer Jean-François Roberval, who would have stayed on the island in 1542, having named it "Havre au Ber,. The term "ber" itself meaning, in this case,  "berceau" (cradle in English, while "havre" is French for harbour). Roberval's child was still a baby at the time; although, in terms of an explanation, this is really nothing but speculation and hearsay. It probably references the ``high quality`` of port; in layman`s terms.

However, "ber" is also a marine term designating the wood structure on which a boat lies during construction or reparation. Yet, while this is an interesting fact to note, it is likely to be a simple slang term in French to reference the berceau, heard and used in conversation by the anglophone population over the years. Meanwhile, an anonymous British map of the area in 1756 named it Harbour Ober, which was in all likelihood, an anglicization of french-origin place-names.  The post office, opened in 1899, bore the name "Amherst Island" until 1907.

In 2000, a new municipality named L'Île-du-Havre-Aubert was constituted following the amalgamation of L'Île-du-Havre-Aubert and the village of L'Île-d'Entrée. Entry Island is the only inhabited island part of the Magdalen Islands unconnected to the rest of the archipelago by land. It is located five kilometres (3 miles) east of Amherst Island and it is one of the three English-speaking centres of the archipelago. It saw its first inhabitants in the early 19th century.

Entry Island owes its name to the fact that it is located at the southeast entrance of the archipelago. A ferry service exists between Entry Island and the village of Grindstone.

Demographics

Population

Language

See also
List of municipalities in Quebec

References

External links
Commission de toponymie du Québec
Ministère des Affaires municipales, des Régions et de l'Occupation du territoire

Incorporated places in Gaspésie–Îles-de-la-Madeleine
Municipalities in Quebec
Magdalen Islands